In number theory, Artin's conjecture on primitive roots states that a given integer a that is neither a square number nor −1 is a primitive root modulo infinitely many primes p. The conjecture also ascribes an asymptotic density to these primes. This conjectural density equals Artin's constant or a rational multiple thereof.

The conjecture was made by Emil Artin to Helmut Hasse on September 27, 1927, according to the latter's diary. The conjecture is still unresolved as of 2023. In fact, there is no single value of a for which Artin's conjecture is proved.

Formulation

Let a be an integer that is not a square number and not −1. Write a = a0b2 with a0 square-free. Denote by S(a) the set of prime numbers p such that a is a primitive root modulo p. Then the conjecture states
 S(a) has a positive asymptotic density inside the set of primes. In particular, S(a) is infinite.
 Under the conditions that a is not a perfect power and that a0 is not congruent to 1 modulo 4 , this density is independent of a and equals Artin's constant, which can be expressed as an infinite product
  .

Similar conjectural product formulas exist for the density when a does not satisfy the above conditions. In these cases, the conjectural density is always a rational multiple of CArtin.

Example
For example, take a = 2. The conjecture claims that the set of primes p for which 2 is a primitive root has the above density CArtin. The set of such primes is 
 S(2) = {3, 5, 11, 13, 19, 29, 37, 53, 59, 61, 67, 83, 101, 107, 131, 139, 149, 163, 173, 179, 181, 197, 211, 227, 269, 293, 317, 347, 349, 373, 379, 389, 419, 421, 443, 461, 467, 491, ...}.
It has 38 elements smaller than 500 and there are 95 primes smaller than 500. The ratio (which conjecturally tends to CArtin) is 38/95 = 2/5 = 0.4.

Partial results

In 1967, Christopher Hooley published a conditional proof for the conjecture, assuming certain cases of the generalized Riemann hypothesis.

Without the generalized Riemann hypothesis, there is no single value of a for which Artin's conjecture is proved. D. R. Heath-Brown proved (Corollary 1) that at least one of 2, 3, or 5 is a primitive root modulo infinitely many primes p. He also proved (Corollary 2) that there are at most two primes for which Artin's conjecture fails.

Some variations of Artin's problem

Elliptic curve 

Moreover, Lang and Trotter conjectured that .

Even order 
Krishnamurty proposed the question how often the period  of the decimal expansion  of a prime  is even.

The result was proven by Hasse in 1966.

See also 
Stephens' constant, a number that plays the same role in a generalization of Artin's conjecture as Artin's constant plays here
Brown–Zassenhaus conjecture
Full reptend prime
Cyclic number (group theory)

References

Analytic number theory
Algebraic number theory
Conjectures about prime numbers
Unsolved problems in number theory